Dear John is a 2010 American romantic war drama film directed by Lasse Hallström, based on the 2006 novel of the same name by Nicholas Sparks. It follows the life of a soldier (Channing Tatum) after he falls in love with a young woman (Amanda Seyfried). They decide to exchange letters to each other after he is deployed to the war. The film was released in North America on February 5, 2010, by Screen Gems, and received mixed to negative reviews.

Plot
In 2003, while serving in the United States Army Special Forces, Staff Sergeant John Tyree is shot in Afghanistan. In a voice-over, he recalls a childhood trip to the U.S. Mint and compares himself to a coin in the United States military, before stating that the last thing he thought of before he blacked out was "you."

Two years earlier in Spring 2001, John is on leave in Charleston, South Carolina. He meets Savannah Curtis, a college student building homes with a group of co-eds for Habitat for Humanity while on spring break. Savannah invites John to a bonfire party where he meets her neighbor, Tim, and his autistic son, Alan. Over the course of two weeks, they go on several dates and eventually fall in love. Savannah also meets John's father who is obsessed with his growing coin collection.

Savannah mentions to John that his father may have Asperger's Syndrome like Tim's son, Alan. An upset John storms off and becomes involved in a fight, and he accidentally strikes Tim, breaking his nose. Savannah sees the commotion and stops speaking to John. John later apologizes to Tim, who offers to give Savannah a message. Savannah later visits John to spend one last day together. Before John leaves, they make a promise to continue their relationship via letters, and vow to tell each other everything.

John and Savannah make plans to start a life together after John gets his discharge from the Army. However, when the September 11 attacks occur, John along with his team request to extend their deployments. As a result, their time apart from each other turn into months and then ultimately years. Back in Charleston, Savannah begins to spend more time with Tim, and decides that she wants to work with autistic children; she plans to build a farm and horse stables where they can enjoy the outdoors and animals. Over the next two years, John and Savannah's romance continues through their letters. Eventually one turns out to be a literal "Dear John" letter, in which Savannah breaks up with John; she explains that while she still loves him, she has developed feelings for someone else and is engaged.

In 2003 after being shot in Afghanistan, John is encouraged to return home but he re-enlists for a second time. Four more years pass, and John is informed that his father has had a stroke, and is sent home to be with him. In the hospital, John reads a letter to his father that he wrote for him; John's voice-over at the beginning of the film was from this letter, in which he told his father that the first thing to cross his mind after he was shot was coins, and the last thing to cross his mind before he lost consciousness was his dad. Soon afterward, his father dies.

After the funeral, John visits Savannah and learns that the man she married was Tim, abandoning her dream of a riding camp for autistic kids because of Tim's fight against Lymphoma. Savannah takes John to the hospital to see him; Tim tells John that Savannah still loves John. Back at the house, John and Savannah enjoy a quiet evening together, and are tempted to pick up where they left off years earlier, but do not go through with their feelings. John says goodbye to Savannah and leaves, but is distraught.

John sells his father's coin collection (except the valuable mule coin that he found with his father years ago) in order to raise money to help with Tim's cancer treatment, then he returns to the military, carrying the mule coin with him as a good luck charm. He receives a final letter from Savannah telling him that they received an anonymous donation but Tim died from his illness after only two months of treatment.

Months later, John, now a civilian, eventually returns home; while in town one day while parking his bike, he sees Savannah at a coffee shop. They reunite and share a hug.

Cast
 Channing Tatum as  SSG John Tyree
 Amanda Seyfried as Savannah Lynn Curtis
 Henry Thomas as Tim Wheddon
 Richard Jenkins as Bill Tyree
 Luke Benward as Alan Wheddon
 Braeden Reed as Young Alan Wheddon
 Scott Porter as Randy
 D.J. Cotrona as Noodles
 Cullen Moss as Rooster
 Gavin McCulley as Starks

Soundtrack

Music
The score to Dear John was composed by Deborah Lurie, who recorded her score with the Hollywood Studio Symphony at the Warner Brothers Eastwood Scoring Stage right after finishing her score for 9. A soundtrack album containing songs was released on February 2, 2010, from Relativity Media Group, and a score album was released digitally the same day.

Release
The film was released on February 5, 2010, in the United States.

Reception

Box office
Dear John has grossed $80,014,842 in North America and $34,962,262 in other territories for a worldwide total of $114,977,104.

In its opening weekend, the film grossed $30,468,614, finishing first at the box office, knocking off Avatar after seven weekends in first place and making it the best debut for a film based on a Nicholas Sparks novel.

The film was the second highest debut for a film opening Super Bowl weekend, just shy of Hannah Montana & Miley Cyrus: Best of Both Worlds Concert in 2008.

Critical reception

The film received negative reviews from critics, with some praising the casting, but many dismissing its characters and writing as generic.

On Rotten Tomatoes, the film holds a 28% approval rating based on 137 reviews, with an average score of 4.50/10. The website's critics consensus reads: "Built from many of the same ingredients as other Nicholas Sparks tearjerkers, Dear John suffers from its clichéd framework, as well as Lasse Hallstrom's curiously detached directing." Metacritic, which assigns a weighted average score out of 100 from film critics' reviews, reports a rating of 43 based on 34 reviews, indicating "mixed or average reviews".

Accolades

Home media

Dear John was released on DVD and Blu-ray on May 25, 2010.

References

External links
 
 
 
 
 
 

2010 films
2010 romantic drama films
2010 war drama films
American romantic drama films
American war drama films
2010s English-language films
Films about autism
Films about United States Army Special Forces
Films based on romance novels
Films based on the September 11 attacks
Films based on works by Nicholas Sparks
Films directed by Lasse Hallström
Films scored by Deborah Lurie
Films set in the 2000s
Films set in Afghanistan
Films set in Charleston, South Carolina
Films shot in South Carolina
Relativity Media films
Screen Gems films
Temple Hill Entertainment films
War in Afghanistan (2001–2021) films
Films produced by Wyck Godfrey
2010s American films